Portnoff is a surname. Notable people with the surname include:

Leo Portnoff (1875–1940), Ukrainian musician, teacher, and composer
Mischa Portnoff (1901–1979), German-born American composer and teacher

See also
Portnov